Herbert Leonard Stevens (died 1989) known as Len Stevens, was a British composer, specializing in light music but producing works in many other categories. Among the best-known pieces he composed were News Scoop (used as the original 1958 theme tune to Grandstand on BBC television) and Easy Street. Stevens learned his trade in the pre-war British dance bands, and was employed as an orchestrator and theatre musician, while contributing original compositions to several recorded music libraries (including Francis, Day and Hunter, Josef Weinberger and KPM).

The orchestral piece Avalanche (1948) is a musical interpretation of an avalanche from its dramatic beginning through a frantic centre piece to its quiet aftermath. Other titles by Stevens include Caribbean Caprice, Clear Night, High Cloud, Holiday on Ice, La Madrilena, Lido Fashion Parade, Madame in Mayfair, Mountain Rally and Stampede. His music was often performed by Sidney Torch and his Orchestra.

External links
 
 Easy Street introduces the short educational film The Daily Round: The Story of Milk Production and Distribution (1954), British Film Institute
 News Reel, KPM Music

References

1989 deaths
British composers
Year of birth missing